The 2017 West Florida Argonauts football team represented the University of West Florida in the 2017 NCAA Division II football season. They were led by second-year head coach Pete Shinnick.  The Argonauts played their home games at Blue Wahoos Stadium and were members of the Gulf South Conference.

Schedule
West Florida announced its 2017 football schedule on February 1, 2017. The schedule consists of 6 home and 5 away games in the regular season. The Argonauts will host GSC foes Delta State, Mississippi College, North Alabama, and Valdosta State, and will travel to Shorter, West Alabama, West Florida, and West Georgia.

The Argonauts will host two of the three non-conference game against Chowan of the Central Intercollegiate Athletic Association and Midwestern State of the Lone Star Conference and will travel to Missouri S&T of the Great Lakes Valley Conference.

The game between Midwestern State and West Florida was cancelled in advance of the arrival of Hurricane Irma.

Rankings

References

West Florida
West Florida Argonauts football seasons
West Florida Argonauts football